Ruposhi Bangla may refer to:

 Ruposhi Bangla, a collection of poems by Bengali poet Jibanananda Das
 Ruposhi Bangla (TV channel), a Bengali entertainment channel in Kolkata

See also 
 Rupashi Bangla Express, a Superfast train that runs between Santragachi Junction and Purulia Junction in India